Hanuman: Da’ Damdaar is a 2017 Indian mythological-adventure animated film, directed by Ruchi Narain, presented by RNB Films in association with R.A.T Films. It is a story of a boy, Hanuman set in 'mythological' times. The concept of the film is for children to have fun and learn something. Salman Khan unveiled the motion poster of the film on the occasion of Hanuman Jayanti on 11 April 2017. The film was released on 2 June 2017.

Voice cast
 Salman Khan as Hanuman
 Arnav Nathani as Maruti
 Hussain Dalal as Garuda
 Raveena Tandon as Anjani
 Saurabh Shukla as Kesari
 Javed Akhtar as Maharishi Valmiki
 Kunal Khemu as Indra
 Viraf Patel as Vishnu
 Makarand Deshpande as Vishrava
 Rajesh Kava as Narad
 Chunky Pandey as Naazuk Tourist Guide
 Vinay Pathak as Popat Sharma
 Sneha Khanwalkar as Seeti
 Prasad Barve as Pig 1, Pig 3, Chotu

Plot
Anjani has not forgotten how her son almost lost his life. Now to protect him, she shelters him in a bid to keep him from harming himself again. She doesn't even allow him to go out of the house.

When his father Senapati Kesari returns from war, he is upset to find that his brave son has become a scared little boy.

Maruti feels bad that his father isn't proud of him, and prays to God to make him the 'bravest kid in the world'.

God answers his prayers and leads Maruti into a series of jungle adventures. His experiences and new friends lead him to metamorphose from a 'Bhola-Bhala Bajrangi' to… HANUMAN DA' DAMDAAR!!

Music
The music for film is composed by Sneha Khanwalkar and lyrics are penned by Abhishek Dubey. The background score is given by Shruti Kumar-Jessica Weiss and Bapi-Tutul. The soundtrack album is released by T-Series. The song "Lakdi Ki Kaathi" is a recreated version of the original song from the 1983 film Masoom which was originally composed by R. D. Burman and written by Gulzar. The music for recreated version is given by Abhishek Arora with additional lyrics by Abhishek Dubey.

See also
 List of Indian animated feature films

References

Indian animated films
2010s Hindi-language films
Indian adventure comedy films
2017 animated films
2017 films
Films scored by Sneha Khanwalkar
Hanuman in popular culture
Indian children's films
Films directed by Ruchi Narain